Thala abelai is a species of sea snail, a marine gastropod mollusk, in the family Costellariidae, the ribbed miters.

Description
The length of the shell attains 9 mm.

Distribution
R-This marine species occurs off Guam..

References

Costellariidae